Adolf Ludwig Sigismund Gusserow (Berlin, 8 July 1836 – Berlin, 8 February 1906) was a German gynecologist who was a native of Berlin. He married Clara Oppenheim (1861–1944), a descendant of Berlin banker Joseph Mendelssohn.

Gusserow began his career as a lecturer of gynecological diseases and obstetrics in Berlin, and afterwards was a professor at the Universities of Utrecht, Zurich and Strasbourg. Later he returned to Berlin as director of the clinic of obstetrics and gynecology at the Berlin-Charité. Two of his better-known students and assistants were Alfred Dührssen (1862-1933) in Berlin, and Paul Zweifel (1848-1927) in Zurich.

In 1870 Gusserow was the first physician to describe a rare type of uterine cervical adenocarcinoma that is sometimes referred to as "adenoma malignum" or as a mucinous type of "minimal deviation adenocarcinoma" (mucinous MDA). It can be recognized by its "deceptively bland" histological appearance. Gusserow published his findings in a treatise titled Ueber Sarcoma des Uterus.

Among his better written efforts was Die Neubildungen des Uterus (Neoplasms of the uterus).

Publications 
 Zur Lehre vom Stoffwechsel des Foetus. Engelhardt, Leipzig, 1872
 Ueber Menstruation und Dysmenorrhoe. Breitkopf and Haertel, Leipzig, 1874
 Die Neubildungen des Uterus. Enke, Stuttgart, 1886 (Reprint 2007, VDM Verlag Dr. Müller)
 Geburtshuelfe und Gynaekologie in Großbritannien - Ein Reisebericht. Engelhardt, Leipzig 1864 (in Google Books online)

Literature 
 Pagel J: Biographisches Lexikon hervorragender Ärzte des neunzehnten Jahrhunderts. Berlin, Vienna 1901, 660-661
 Nagel W: Adolf Gusserow (1836—1906). BJOG 9 (2005), 385-6,

References 
 
 Biography in Catalogue of scientific Collections of the Humboldt-University of Berlin
 Portrait in the Portrait Collection of  Berlin Lecturers of the  Humboldt-University of Berlin
  Cytologic and Cytochemical features of Adenoma Malignum of the Uterine Cervix
 Libri.de (short biography of Adolf Gusserow)

1836 births
1906 deaths
Academic staff of Utrecht University
Academic staff of the University of Strasbourg
Academic staff of the University of Zurich
German gynaecologists
German obstetricians
Physicians from Berlin
People from the Province of Brandenburg
Mendelssohn family